Alexander Sands may refer to:

 Alex Sands (1870–?), footballer who played for Port Vale
 Alexander Hamilton Sands (1828–1887), American lawyer, writer, and Baptist minister